Elizabeth Sewell (March 9, 1919 – January 12, 2001) was a British-American critic, poet, novelist, and professor who often wrote about the connections between science and literature. Among her published works were five books of criticism, four novels, three books of poetry, and many short stories, essays, and other work in periodicals in North America and Europe. Of her books, the most widely held by libraries is The Orphic Voice: Poetry and Natural History.

Sewell completed the requirements for a Bachelor of Arts from Cambridge University in 1942. From then to the end of World War II, she worked for the Ministry of Education in London before returning to Cambridge for a Master of Arts (1945) and a Ph.D. (1949) in modern languages. She first visited the United States in 1949 and became a U.S. citizen in 1973. She taught at Vassar College, the University of Notre Dame, the University of North Carolina at Greensboro, Fordham University, Tougaloo College, and Hunter College, and she was a visiting professor or writer at other universities.

She held a Simon Fellowship at Manchester University (1955−57), a Howard Research Fellowship at Ohio State University (1949−50), an Ashley Fellowship at Trent University (1979), and a Presidential Scholarship at Mercer University (1982). In 1981, she won poetry, fiction, and nonfiction awards from the American Academy of Arts and Letters.

Sewell married Anthony C. Sirignano, a university lecturer in classics, in 1971. She died in 2001 in Greensboro, North Carolina.

Bibliography

Criticism
 The Structure of Poetry (1951) 
 Paul Valery, the Mind in the Mirror (1952) 
 The Field of Nonsense (1952) 
 The Orphic Voice: Poetry and Natural History (1960) ; introduction by David Schenck, New York : New York Review Books, [2021], 
 The Human Metaphor (1964) 
 Lewis Carroll: Voices from France (2008 – published posthumously)

Essays
 To Be a True Poem: Essays (1979)

Poetry
 Poems, 1947−1961 (1962) 
 Signs and Cities (1968) 
 Acquist (1984)

Novels
 The Dividing of Time (1951) 
 The Singular Hope (1955) 
 Now Bless Thyself (1962) 
 The Unlooked-For (1995)

Memoir
 An Idea (1983)

Other
 For Love (1980) 

Sewell's papers, including manuscripts, correspondence, research, diaries, audio, and other material, are on file in the Howard Gotlieb Archival Research Center at Boston University.

References

1919 births
2001 deaths
20th-century American novelists
20th-century American women writers
20th-century British women writers
Alumni of the University of Cambridge
Writers from Greensboro, North Carolina
British people in colonial India
British emigrants to the United States
Vassar College faculty
University of North Carolina at Greensboro faculty
University of Notre Dame faculty
Fordham University faculty
Tougaloo College faculty
Hunter College faculty
American literary critics
Women literary critics
American women novelists
American women poets
20th-century American essayists
American women academics
American women critics